Venkayya or Venkaiah (Telugu: వెంకయ్య)is both a surname and a given name. Notable people with the name include:

Pingali Venkayya (1876–1963), Indian independence activist and flag designer
V. Venkayya (1864–1912), Indian epigraphist and historian

Raghupathi Venkaiah Naidu (1869–1941), widely regarded as the father of Telugu cinema 
Venkaiah Naidu, Vice-president of India.